Nematochares is a monotypic moth genus in the family Depressariidae. Its only species, Nematochares citraulax, is found in Brazil. Both the genus and species were first described by Edward Meyrick in 1931.

References

Moths described in 1931
Depressariinae
Monotypic moth genera